The following lists events that happened during 2015 in the Principality of Andorra.

Incumbents
Prime Minister: Antoni Marti

Events

March
 March 1 - Despite losing five seats, the Democrats for Andorra narrowly retains their absolute majority in the General Council, winning 15 of the 28 seats.

Deaths

References

 
2010s in Andorra
Years of the 21st century in Andorra
Andorra
Andorra